The Mohammed V Stadium is a multi-purpose stadium which is part of the Mohammed V Athletic Complex which is named after King Mohammed V and situated at the heart of Casablanca, Morocco, in the western part of the Maârif neighborhood. The stadium has a seating capacity of 46,000, making it the oldest football stadium in Morocco.

It primarily hosts association football matches, serving as the home ground of the Morocco national football team and local rival football clubs Wydad AC and Raja CA. In 1997, the stadium set a record of attendance of 110,000 during the Casablanca football derby and a match between the Moroccan national team against Ghana. The same record attendance was repeated during Morocco's match against Argentina in 2004.

History 

On March 6, 1955, the stadium was inaugurated under the name  in honour of the French boxer, with a capacity of 30,000. This stadium witnessed Morocco qualify for the 1970 FIFA World Cup, which was their first ever World Cup.

At the end of the 1970s, in preparation for the 1983 Mediterranean Games which were held in Casablanca, the stadium was closed for a major renovation; with an increase of the seating capacity, installation of an electronic scoreboard and construction of a 12,000-capacity indoor gymnasium and a 3,000-capacity Olympic-sized swimming pool around the stadium. It reopened in 1981 under its current name, Stade Mohammed V.

Today, the complex has the stadium itself, the gymnasium, the swimming pool, a 650 m2 media centre, a conference room, a meeting room, a care centre, and an anti-doping centre.

Stade Mohammed V is located right in the centre of Casablanca. The international airport in Casablanca, also named after Mohammed V, is 25 kilometres from the stadium and the Casa-Voyageurs rail station is 5 kilometres from the stadium. The stadium has a parking lot with a capacity of 1,000 cars.

In the 2006–07 season, the stadium was renovated again with the inclusion of a semi-artificial lawn of a high standard. It reopened in April 2007.

A reform agreement was signed in 2015 between the Ministry of Youth and Sports, Royal Moroccan Football Federation, the Casablanca City Council and the Ministry of the Interior, allocating a budget of 220 million Moroccan dirhams.

This amount was mainly allocated to rehabilitate the stadium to meet international standards, such as the quality of the chairs, grass and other equipment of the other facilities, including the electronic clock, clothing stores, rest areas, the press platform and the corridors, in addition to repairs in its surroundings.

Currently, Mohammed V Stadium is built on an area of 12 hectares (12,262 square metres), and is considered a masterpiece of Moroccan sports, as it accommodates about 80,000 spectators and includes a large sports hall containing 12,000 seats, and includes facilities for many sports, such as basketball, handball, volleyball, gymnastics, and boxing, and an Olympic swimming pool.

Usage

Matches

International events 
The stadium hosted the following international events:
 1983 Mediterranean Games
1983 Palestine Cup of Nations for Youth
 1988 African Cup of Nations Final
 1998 CAF Super Cup
 2000 CAF Super Cup
 2015 African Amateur Boxing Championships
 2017 CAF Champions League Final
 2018 CAF Super Cup
 2018 African Nations Championship Final
 2021 CAF Champions League Final 
 2022 CAF Champions League Final

See also
List of African stadiums by capacity
List of football stadiums in Morocco

References

External links
Stadium profile and photos at World Stadiums
Stadium profile and photos at Daum Cafe
Stadium profile and photos at Fussball Tempel

Sports venues completed in 1955
Football venues in Morocco
Athletics (track and field) venues in Morocco
Morocco
Sports venues in Casablanca
Stade Mohamed V
Stade Mohamed V
1955 establishments in Morocco
Stadiums of the African Games
20th-century architecture in Morocco